Kurt Gunnar Weckström (4 December 1911 – 7 January 1983) was a Finnish footballer. He earned 35 caps for the Finland national football team and was a member of the Finland squad at the 1936 Summer Olympics.

Career 
Weckström started his career in the Helsinki working class side Töölön Vesa, playing in the Finnish Workers' Sports Federation (TUL) Championship series. Due to the 1918 Civil War, Finnish football was divided, TUL and the Finnish Football Association (SPL) had their own leagues and the national team was composed of SPL players only.

Weckström won the TUL Championship title in 1930 and was a member of the TUL football team at the 1931 Workers' Summer Olympiad in Vienna. Soon after the Olympiad, he defected to the ″bourgeoisie″ KIF Helsinki, which made him eligible for the national team. Weckström debuted for Finland in October 1931 against Denmark. In the Finland squad at the 1936 Summer Olympics, he was one of the eight former TUL players who had defected to the Finnish Football Association side.

Club honours 
Finnish Workers' Sports Federation Championship: 1930
Finnish Championship: 1936, 1938

References 

1911 births
1983 deaths
Footballers from Helsinki
Association football forwards
Finnish footballers
Finland international footballers
Footballers at the 1936 Summer Olympics
Olympic footballers of Finland
Mestaruussarja players
Helsingin Jalkapalloklubi players